Georgia Clay is the seventh studio album by American singer Josh Kelley. It is his first country music album, and it was released via MCA Nashville on March 22, 2011.

Content
Georgia Clay is Kelley's first release to the country music format. Kelley co-wrote the title track with his brother, Charles Kelley of Lady Antebellum, and album producer Clint Lagerberg.

Critical reception
Karlie Justus of Engine 145 rated the album three-and-a-half stars out of five, saying that it was "surprisingly satisfactory" but criticizing the production choices on some songs. It also received three-and-a-half stars from Country Weekly reviewer Jessica Phillips, who criticized the title track for being "too familiar to be gripping", but said of the rest of the album, "Overall, Josh's sound boasts enough twang to keep it country and enough soulful passion to keep things interesting." Giving it two-and-a-half stars, Andrew Leahey of Allmusic wrote that Kelley "doesn’t sound entirely convincing as a Nashville star." He also thought that Kelley's voice sounded "forced" and that the lyrics lacked hooks.

Track listing

Personnel
Tom Brislin- Wurlitzer
Alan Chang- Fender Rhodes, Hammond B-3 organ, piano
Chad Cromwell- drums
Jerry Douglas- dobro
Eric Kertes- bass guitar
Rob Hatch- crowd noise
Wes Hightower- background vocals
Dan Hochhalter- fiddle, strings
Darwin Johnson- bass guitar
Charlie Judge- Hammond B-3 organ, keyboards, piano, tack piano, Wurlitzer 
Gene Jung- drums
Josh Kelley- crowd noise, acoustic guitar, harmonica, shaker, tambourine, lead vocals, background vocals
Clint Lagerberg- crowd noise, acoustic guitar, bass guitar, electric guitar, tenor guitar, handclapping, mandolin, programming, string arrangements, background vocals 
Chris McHugh- drums, percussion
Ashley Monroe- background vocals 
Dottie Rager- crowd noise 
Shannan Tipton-Neese- crowd noise 
Glenn Worf- bass guitar

Charts

References

2011 albums
MCA Records albums
Josh Kelley albums